Alluri is a 2022 Indian Telugu-language action crime drama film directed by Pradeep Varma and starring Sree Vishnu and Kayadu Lohar.

Plot 
Iqbal, a police trainee son of a retired constable Naseeruddin, learns about is honest sincere brave and intelligent police officer named Alluri Sita Ramaraju. To make him learn more about him Nasiruddin sends Iqbal to Kothavalasa police station, Visakhapatnam.
Iqbal learns about Ramaraju's honest activities in Kothavalasa. After that Ramaraju is transferred to Dharakonda. There Iqbal learns that, Ramaraju told to the naxalites that how they are formed and the greatness of police and took their help to build a police station in Dharakonda. By knowing it Iqbal feels very inspiracious and ask Naseeruddin that about his personal life. Then Naseeruddin tells to Iqbal that Ramaraju is transferred to beach road Vizag as CI, after so many transfers. There his parents convinced him and makes him marry Sandhya, whose native place also is Vizag. Meanwhile, he learns about a notorious rowdy sheeter named Kali, who controls a market in Vizag and the right hand of 
MP and his illegal activities. When Rama Raju arrests Kali, his higher officer will acquit Kali and asks Ramaraju to meet MP. Rama Raju will challenge MP that I will definitely change you. One day a student girl from a college will come to Ramaraju and files a case against MP's son and his friends that, they are  selling the drugs in her college. But her father will tell Ramaraju that don't bother about her. I don't want to interfere in the issues of very influential people. But Rama Raju encourages her and makes her to write a complaint and Rama Raju arrests MP's son and takes him to the police station. There he can't see the girl nor her father and higher officer will send MP's son to his home in the same vehicle where Ramaraju arrested him. Enraged, Ramaraju attempts to manhandle on his higher officer and his higher officer will take him to commissioner by complaining that, Rama Raju attempted to manhandle on him. But, commissioner has good impression on Ramaraju and commissioner will tell Ramaraju that it's not good as you be very furious and I like your honesty. Then Ramaraju slaps is higher officer in front of commissioner and asks commissioner to suspend him for two weeks. Ramaraju and Sandhya will go to foreign and they will come in few days. When they came to Vizag, in the airport, Ramaraju police station constables will take Ramaraju to a hospital. There Ramaraju saw the girl who gave him complaint against MP's son. The constable describes to Ramaraju that Kali, MP's son and his friend came to police station and rapes the girl in the  police station and in front of her father and they made everybody to learn that. Then the girl's father will scolds Ramaraju for arresting MP's son. Enraged on MP's son, his friend and Kali, Ramaraju takes the girl to the market which is controlled by Kali and keeps the girl on a pillar where the flag is hosted. There in the girl's hand Ramaraju keeps a sharp coconut peeling spear and thrashes Kali's men to death and kills Kali, MP's son and his friend by stabbing their throats to the coconut peeling spear and the girl dies. When Ramaraju comes in police uniform, everyone will claim that the girl came from hospital and killed, Kali, MP's son and his friend.
In present, when Iqbal returned to his house, then, he requests Naseeruddin, to meet Rama Raju. But, Naseeruddin tells to Iqbal that, few years back, Rama Raju passed away in a terrorist hijack in a nearby school. By listening this news, Iqbal shocks and asks how Ramaraju passed away. Then Naseeruddin tells Iqbal that, we need to meet commissioner to learn the answers to your questions. When they met commissioner Iqbal ask commissioner that how Rama Raju passed away and what is the link between Ramaraju and the terrorist activities. Then the commissioner told that after the incident, I transferred Rama Raju as a traffic police. There also Ramaraju used to do duty, very sincerely. One day commissioner calls Ramaraju to his guest house when he became the commissioner to Hyderabad and tells Ramaraju about one case in Hyderabad and to come there. In Hyderabad, a colony named, Mir Ali Bagh is there. In that community no one are well-educated and they will not believe nor encourage police and if the face any problems they'll go to the local leaders. By taking it as an opportunity the terrorists planned to  start their operations from here only. There Naseeruddin introduced himself to Rama Raju. Ramaraju makes Naseeruddin to do very sincere duty in the markets. By seeing his effort, slowly, people started getting good impression on police and started giving respect to Naseeruddin and his wife. One day, Rama Raju got a case from the Naseeruddin's colony by Naseeruddin. It is a student girl is kidnapped. Ramaraju convinces the girls parents by telling the greatness of police and make them lodge kidnap case. In the investigation Ramaraju knew that, she is kidnapped in a Hotel by a car whose number plate is fake. Then he saw he knew that there is another floor between 12th and 13th floors in that Hotel. When he and his assistant went into that floor then they saw the missing student girls handbag in the floor where they saw in the lift CCTV footage. In that investigation Ramaraju gets a threatening calls that to stop the investigation and slowly Sandhya started fearing, as they scares her in the house and Ramaraju's mother encourages Sandhya to don't be fearful. But one day, when Sandhya and Ramaraju's mother were getting the vegetables from the market, then, Ramaraju's mother met with an accident in the same car, where the student girl is kidnapped. When the Ramaraju knows about the information about that car, he goes to the garage where the men have kidnaped student girl and thrashes them and their leader will tell that, we have started an adult girls business in the floor between 12th and 13th floor in the hotel. By getting doubt on us, the girl attempted to gather the information that, what is happening in this floor. We don't have an another option and kidnapped her and killed her two days back. Buy knowing it Rama Raju kicks him into the cell and saves the girls whom they kidnapped and gave them to their families. One day I'm mechanic come to police station by complaining about a boy named Ali, who is very suspicious in his garage. When Naseeruddin and another constable went to the garage to get  Ali to police station for the interrogation, then a group of terrorists killed one of the constable and took Ali with them when Naseeruddin inform to Ramaraju then he knew that, Ali is a terrorist gang leader. Then Ramaraju and his gang will search for a group of terrorist and arrests them in a mosque. As Sandhya gets a lot of fear, she left to Vizag for some days and Ramaraju feels embarrassed, without Sandhya. But one day, Ali and his terrorist group will hijack a School, where so many celebrities children including commissioner's daughter are studying in that school. Ali will demand the media to release the terrorists whom, Ramaraju arrested. But Rama Raju will select a for members from the department and attacks and kills the terrorists, one by one, without getting captured in the CCTV camera and made Ali believe that, their men are being in same place. But, Ali we will get doubt and threatens Ramaraju that, I captivated the school principal and commissioner's daughter. If you don't come into the conference room, where I captivated them, I will shoot them to death, in front of the media. When Ramaraju goes into the conference room then, Ali's henchmen will hit Ramaraju on his head with a trophy and makes him, unconscious. Then the Ramaraju's four members will hear the gun firing sound of a two bullets and they will take the staff and students including commissioner's daughter and principal outside. Sandhya is watching the news in TV about this but unfortunately, Ramaraju is killed. During the commissioner describe the greatness of Ramaraju, then, the principal will come with a CD to him and plays it. In that, Ali and his henchman beats Ramaraju very badly with the trophy by tying him to a pillar in front of principal and commissioner's daughter. They forces Ramaraju to say "jihad". But, Ramaraju refused to say. Enraged, Ali makes his henchman to chop Ramaraju's penis and Ali points his gun on commissioner's daughter. However, Ramaraju manages to untie his knots and kills Ali and his henchman using Ali's henchman's gun by saying, "Jai Hind" and dies. By watching the video, everyone will salute at Ramaraju in the hall including, Sandhya and Ramaraju's parents. In present, Iqbal asks Ramaraju's photo and when commissioner shows it, Iqbal salutes at, Ramaraju's photo.

Cast 

Sree Vishnu as Alluri Seetha Rama Raju 
Kayadu Lohar as Sandhya
Suman as Commissioner 
Tanikella Bharani as Naseeruddin  
 Raja Ravindra as Rama Raju's higher officer
 Prudhvi Raj as Rama Raju's higher officer
 Madhusudhan Rao as MP
 Pramodini Pammi as Ramaraju's mother
Ravi Varma as Kali, a notorious rowdy sheeter, who controls a market in Vizag.
 Jayavani
 Vasu Inturi
 Vennela Rama Rao as Ramaraju's assistant 
 Srinivas Vadlamani as Ramaraju's father

Soundtrack

Reception 
A critic from The Times of India wrote that "However, despite solid performances, the film goes downhill after the interval with more conflicts to resolve, routine setting in; and its overarching timeline is its nemesis". A critic from 123telugu said that "On the whole, Alluri does engage only in a few scenes".

References

External links 

2020s Telugu-language films
Indian crime action films
Indian crime drama films